This article contains the saints canonized by Pope Benedict XVI.  Pope Benedict XVI canonized 45 saints during his seven-year reign as Pope from 2005 to 2013:

See also
List of saints canonized by Pope Leo XIII
List of saints canonized by Pope Pius XI
List of saints canonized by Pope Pius XII
List of saints canonized by Pope John XXIII
List of saints canonized by Pope Paul VI
List of saints canonized by Pope John Paul II
List of saints canonized by Pope Francis

References

Benedict XVI